A Merchant Category Code (MCC) is a four-digit number listed in ISO 18245 for retail financial services. An MCC is used to classify a business by the types of goods or services it provides.

Assignment of MCCs
MCCs are assigned either by merchant type (e.g., one for hotels, one for office supply stores, etc.) or by merchant name (e.g., 3000 for United Airlines) and is assigned to a merchant by a credit card company when the business first starts accepting that card as a form of payment. The same business may code differently with different credit cards, and different sections or departments of a store may code differently.

Uses of MCCs
An MCC reflects the primary category in which a merchant does business and may be used:
 to determine the interchange fee paid by the merchant, with riskier lines of business paying higher fees
 by credit card companies to offer cash back rewards or reward points, for spending in specific categories  
 by card networks to define rules and restrictions for card transactions (for example, Automated Fuel Dispensers (MCC 5542) have specific rules for authorization and clearing messages)
 for tax purposes, e.g., in the United States, to determine whether a payment is primarily for “services”, which needs to be reported by the payor to the Internal Revenue Service for tax purposes, or for “merchandise”,  which does not

MCC lookup tools
There are multiple resources credit card users can consult to predict how credit card purchases with given vendors may be categorized.  Examples include:

See also
 ISO 8583
 ISO 18245
 NAICS Code
 Standard Industrial Classification

References

Credit card terminology